Anna Maria Walburga Mozart (née Pertl; 25 December 1720 – 3 July 1778) was the mother of Wolfgang Amadeus Mozart (1756–1791) and Maria Anna Mozart (1751–1829).

Life

Youth

She was born in St. Gilgen, Archbishopric of Salzburg, to Eva Rosina (1681–1755) and Wolfgang Nicolaus Pertl (1667–1724), deputy prefect of Hildenstein. Nicolaus had a university degree in jurisprudence from the Benedictine University in Salzburg and held many positions of responsibility, including district superintendent in St. Andrae. He was apparently a skilled musician. During the last portion of his life, he fell deeply into debt, and he died on 7 March 1724.

Nicolaus's possessions were liquidated to help pay the debt, and his remaining family (Anna Maria's mother and her older sister Maria Rosina, born 24 August 1719) lapsed into poverty. They moved to Salzburg, not far away, and lived on a charity pension of just eight (later nine) florins per month, perhaps supplemented by low-level employment. Anna Maria's older sister died in 1728, aged nine. Anna Maria herself was not well when she was young: legal documents from the time describe her as "constantly ill" (1733) and "the constantly ill bedridden daughter" (1739).

Marriage and children

She married Leopold Mozart in Salzburg in 1747; Abert writes, "the two were regarded at the time as the handsomest couple in Salzburg." The couple moved (perhaps with Anna Maria's mother) into an apartment on the third floor of Getreidegasse 9. Their landlord was Lorenz Hagenauer, who was a close friend of Leopold's, and a frequent correspondent on the family's later travels.

The Mozarts had seven children, of whom only two survived infancy:
 Johann Leopold Joachim (18 August 1748 – 2 February 1749)
 Maria Anna Cordula (18 June 1749 – 24 June 1749)
 Maria Anna Nepomucena Walpurgis (13 May 1750 – 29 July 1750)
 Maria Anna Walburga Ignatia (Nannerl) (30 July 1751 – 29 October 1829)
 Johann Karl Amadeus (4 November 1752 – 2 February 1753)
 Maria Crescentia Francisca de Paula (9 May 1754 – 27 June 1754)
 Johann Chrysostomus Wolfgang Amadeus (27 January 1756 – 5 December 1791)

Anna Maria nearly died giving birth to Wolfgang. Her womb retained the placenta, and its subsequent enforced removal at that time posed an extreme risk of fatal infection.

The two surviving children achieved fame. The daughter Maria Anna was called "Nannerl" as a child. She was a talented musician who performed with her brother on tour, but whose later life was very limited in its experiences and possibilities. The son, Wolfgang Amadeus, born 27 January 1756, achieved distinction first as a child prodigy, later as one of the most celebrated of all composers.

Family life

Assessing the evidence of the surviving letters, Abert writes of her role as spouse:  "she understood her husband's phlegmatic and painfully conscientious nature and did all she could to spare him the numerous troubles and worries that stemmed from it, a task that cannot have been easy, given his perpetual mistrust, and there is no doubt that she will have drawn a veil over many an unpleasant incident not merely out of prudence, but also from fear. She was utterly devoted to him and willingly submitted to the strict regime to which he inevitably and unquestioningly subjected her." Concerning Anna Maria as a mother, he says, "It was a pure and healthy spirit that reigned in the Mozart household... and Anna Maria must take much of the credit for this. Above all, she was a true mother to her children, who  invariably sought refuge with her when their father's strict hand weighed unduly heavily upon them. Wolfgang loved and admired her to distraction." The letters record that Anna Maria participated with zest in the family's tendency toward scatological humor, a tendency seen more strongly in Wolfgang.

Anna Maria went on the series of tours (1762–1768) through Europe, during which the two children were exhibited as prodigies. She unwillingly remained in Salzburg with Nannerl during the tours of Italy that Wolfgang and Leopold took during 1769–1773. In 1777, she accompanied the now-adult Wolfgang (again unwillingly) on a job-hunting tour that took him to Augsburg, Mannheim, and Paris.

Death
While in Paris, Anna Maria died on 3 July 1778 of a sudden, undiagnosed illness. She was buried in the cemetery of Saint-Eustache.

Notes

References

External links
 
 Biography of Anna Maria Pertl Mozart

1720 births
1778 deaths
People from Salzburg-Umgebung District
Anna Maria
18th-century Austrian people
18th-century Austrian women